The Linux framebuffer (fbdev) is a linux subsystem used to show graphics on a computer monitor, typically on the system console.

It was designed as a hardware-independent API to give user space software access to the framebuffer (the part of a computer's video memory containing a current video frame) using only the Linux kernel's own basic facilities and its device file system interface, avoiding the need for libraries like SVGAlib which effectively implemented video drivers in user space.

In most applications, fbdev has been superseded by the linux Direct Rendering Manager subsystem, but as of 2022, several drivers provide both DRM and fbdev APIs for backwards compatibility with software that has not been updated to use the DRM system, and there are still fbdev drivers for older (mostly embedded) hardware that does not have a DRM driver.

Applications
There are three applications of the Linux framebuffer:
 An implementation of text Linux console that doesn't use hardware text mode (useful when that mode is unavailable, or to overcome its restrictions on glyph size, number of code points etc.). One popular aspect of this is the ability to have console show the Tux logo at boot up.
 A possible graphic output method for a display server, independent of video adapter hardware and its drivers.
 Graphic programs avoiding the overhead of the X Window System.
Examples of the third application include Linux programs such as MPlayer, links2, Netsurf, w3m, fbff, fbida, and fim and libraries such as GLUT, SDL (version 1.2), GTK, and Qt, which can all use the framebuffer directly. This use case is particularly popular in embedded systems.

The now defunct DirectFB is another project aimed at providing a framework for hardware acceleration of the Linux framebuffer.

There was also a windowing system called FramebufferUI (fbui) implemented in kernel-space that provided a basic 2D windowing experience with very little memory use.

History
Linux has generic framebuffer support since 2.1.109 kernel.

It was originally implemented to allow the kernel to emulate a text console on systems such as the Apple Macintosh that do not have a text-mode display, and was later expanded to Linux's originally supported IBM PC compatible platform.

See also

 Direct Rendering Infrastructure
 KMS driver
 SVGAlib.

References

External links
 
 XFree86 doc

Free software programmed in C
Free system software
Interfaces of the Linux kernel
Linux APIs